Maid in England is the fourth and final studio album by the American drag queen Divine. It contains 12 songs. The album's first three singles, "Walk Like a Man", "Twistin' the Night Away" and "Hard Magic", all charted in the UK.

Critical reception
Reviewing the album's re-release for Louder Than War, Phil Newall wrote that "all the expected Hi-NRG characteristics are present, frantic syncopated beats, massed male backing vocals insistent keyboard melodies", concluding that "what lifts Divine from the ranks of Hi-NRG masses are the growled vocals and the knowledge that Divine actually lived a counter culture life style as opposed to just singing about it."

Track listing
"Divine's Theme" (Colin Peter, Ian Penman, Nick Titchener)
"You Think You're a Man" (Geoffrey Deane)
"Give It Up" (Paul Klein, Philip Walsh)
"I'm So Beautiful" (Mike Stock, Matt Aitken)
"Show Me Around" (Philip Walsh)
"Walk Like a Man" (Bob Crewe, Bob Gaudio)
"Twistin' the Night Away" (Sam Cooke)
"Good Time '88" (Colin Peter, Nick Titchener)
"Hard Magic" (Magic Mix) (Mick Flinn, Nick Titchener, Pete Ware, Peter Morris) 
"Little Baby" (Bruce Woolley, Richard Underwood)
"Hey You!" (Francis Usmar, Steve Johnston)
"Divine Reprise" (Colin Peter, Ian Penman)
"Hey You!" (Trumpet Mix) (Nick Titchener)

References

External links
 Discogs

Divine (performer) albums
1988 albums
Bellaphon Records albums